Elafina is a former municipality in Pieria regional unit, Greece. Since the 2011 local government reform it is part of the municipality Katerini, of which it is a municipal unit. The municipal unit has an area of 160.690 km2. The population of the municipal unit was 4,313 in 2011. The seat of the municipality was in Palaio Keramidi.

Administrative division
The municipal unit of Elafina consists of the following communities (populations in 2011):
Aronas, population 324
Elafos, population 499
Exochi, population 583
Exochi, population 446
Toxo, population 137
Katalonia, population 396
Lagorrachi, population 557
Lagorrachi, population 454
Meliadi, population 103
Moschopotamos, population 543
Palaio Keramidi, population 890
Trilofos, Pieria, population 521
The community of Exochi consists of two settlements: Exochi and Toxo. The community of Lagorrachi consists of the settlements of Lagorrachi and Meliadi.

References

Populated places in Pieria (regional unit)
Katerini

bg:Катерини (дем)